Menzelinsk is a town in the Republic of Tatarstan, Russia.

Menzelinsk may also refer to:

Menzelinsk Airport, an airport in the Republic of Tatarstan, Russia

See also
Menzelya River
Menzelinsky District